The men's long jump at the 2013 Asian Athletics Championships was held at the Shree Shiv Chhatrapati Sports Complex. The final took place on 5 July.

Medalists

Results

Qualification

Final

References
Results

Long
Long jump at the Asian Athletics Championships